Marinus Valentijn (21 October 1900, Sint Willebrord - 3 November 1991, Sint Willebrord) was a Dutch professional road bicycle racer. He is most known for his bronze medal in the Elite race of the 1933 UCI Road World Championships.

Palmares 

1929
 1st, The Hague-Brussels
1930
 1st, The Hague-Brussels
1932 - Demol
 Dutch National Road Race Championship
 1st, Ronde van Noordoost-Brabant
 6th, World Road Race Championship
1933 - Demol
  World Road Race Championship
 3rd, National Road Race Championship
 3rd, Grand Prix des Nations
1934
 11th, World Road Race Championship
1935
 Dutch National Road Race Championship
 10th, Vuelta a España

External links
Valentijn at the cyclingwebsite

1900 births
1991 deaths
Dutch male cyclists
Cyclists from Rucphen
UCI Road World Championships cyclists for the Netherlands